The 2013 Olympic Hopes competition was a women's artistic gymnastics competition for junior gymnasts. The competition was held in Penza, Russia from June 19-21. The gymnasts competing were from Russia, Ukraine, Brazil, Turkey, Uzbekistan, Kazakhstan, and Lithuania.

Schedule

Medal winners

Individual all-around

Vault

Uneven Bars

Balance Beam

Floor Exercise

References 

Olympic Hopes